Argyresthia retinella is a species of moth of the family Yponomeutidae.

Distribution
These moths can be found in Europe, across the Palearctic to Japan and Ussuri. They are very common in the British Isles compared to other moth species.

Habitat
This species is present in deciduous forest environments where birch grows.

Description
Argyresthia retinella has a wingspan of 9–10 mm. Forewings are white with subtle greyish or light brown markings, with a darker drawing on the wing tip. Hind wings are gray.

This species is rather similar to Argyresthia thuiella and Argyresthia fundella.

Biology
Argyresthia retinella is a univoltine species. Adults are on the wing from June to July depending on the location. Eggs of these moths were found almost exclusively on lichens. The larvae feed on the catkins and shoots of birch (Betula species).

Bibliography
 Elverum, E., T.J. Johnsen & A.C. Nilssen (2003): Life history, egg cold hardiness and diapause of Argyresthia retinella (Lepidoptera: Yponomeutidae). — Norwegian Journal of Entomology 50(1): 43–53.

References

External links
 
 Sammlung Naturhistorisches Museum Stockholm 
 Lepiforum

Yponomeutidae
Moths described in 1839
Moths of Japan
Moths of Europe
Taxa named by Philipp Christoph Zeller